These are the Czechoslovakia national football team results and fixtures.

Czechoslovakia national football team results

Pre World War II

1946–1969

1970–1993

See also
 Czech Republic national football team results (1994–2019)
 Czech Republic national football team results (2020–present)
 Czechoslovakia national football team

References

External links 
Czechoslovakia (CSR/CSSR/RCS) - List of International Matches - RSSSF

 

Czechoslovakia national football team matches